On 15 August 2019, 28-year-old English police constable Andrew Harper was killed near Sulhamstead, Berkshire, England in the line of duty. Harper and a fellow officer were responding to a report of a burglary, after which Harper was dragged behind a car for a mile (1.6 km), causing his death. In July 2020, three teenage males were found guilty of manslaughter and received sentences of 16 and 13 years imprisonment. They were acquitted on the charge of murder. Harper's killing led to the passing of Harper's Law, which introduced a mandatory sentence of life imprisonment for anyone convicted of killing emergency workers.

Background 
Andrew James Harper (22 March 1991 – 15 August 2019) grew up in Wallingford. He was educated at The Henley College, where he showed an ambition for joining the police.

Harper initially joined Thames Valley Police as a special constable in 2010 at the age of 19, before joining as a regular police constable in 2011. He joined Thames Valley Police's road policing unit approximately six weeks before his death, and was based at the force's Abingdon station. On 18 July 2019, Harper married his partner of 13 years, Lissie (née Beckett). They had been expecting to go on their honeymoon in mid-August.

Incident 
At 23:17 on 15 August 2019, Thames Valley Police received a 999 call from a property near Stanford Dingley, Berkshire, reporting a burglary-in-progress and theft of a quad bike. Harper and fellow constable Andrew Shaw, who were finishing a surveillance shift in Reading, responded to the call in their unmarked BMW police car. At 23:28, Shaw and Harper happened upon a SEAT Toledo towing the stolen quad bike on Admoor Lane near Bradfield Southend. Harper, the passenger of the BMW, alighted the police vehicle and ran to the suspects' vehicle. In doing so, he was caught in a strap that had been used to tow the quad bike. With the quad bike no longer attached, the suspects drove south-east on Lambden's Hill with Harper "lassoed" to the rear of the SEAT vehicle.

Shaw lost sight of the SEAT but in his pursuit found Harper's stab vest in the road. The SEAT crossed the A4 into Ufton Lane near Sulhamstead, and Harper became disentangled. At 23:30, Shaw received a radio transmission from another responding officer which warned of "a body in the road"; Shaw replied that he believed the body was that of Harper. Shaw arrived at the location to find another officer tending to Harper, who was pronounced dead by paramedics at 23:45.

The SEAT was later found at Four Houses Corner travellers' site near Burghfield Common by a police helicopter using thermal imaging.

Investigation and legal proceedings 
At 00:50 on 16 August, police arrested an 18-year-old male and a 17-year-old male at the caravan site. In a separate operation, a 20-year-old man from Pingewood was arrested on suspicion of murder. A second 17-year-old male was also later arrested. Media reported that in total, 10 males aged between 13 and 30 had been arrested. On 19 August, the 20-year-old was charged with murder.

On 17 August, Thames Valley Police's Major Crimes Unit stated that a post mortem performed the previous day gave Harper's cause of death as "multiple injuries", which was congruent with their theory that he had been "caught between a vehicle and the road, and then dragged for a distance". The post mortem also showed that Harper had sustained a "very severe" brain injury; a pathologist stated that it was likely Harper lost consciousness when he fell to the ground. Investigations showed that Harper was dragged  in 91 seconds, with the defendants averaging .

On 18 September, 18-year-old Henry Long and 17-year-olds Albert Bowers and Jessie Cole were charged with murder. A fourth male, a 21-year-old from Basingstoke, was charged with conspiracy to steal a quad bike and subsequently pleaded guilty to the charge. On 19 September, the Crown Prosecution Service said that they had discontinued the case against a fifth defendant, a 20-year-old who had previously been charged with the murder.

Trial 
The murder trial, presided over by Mr. Justice Andrew Edis, began at the Old Bailey on 10 March 2020. Bowers and Cole—both minors at the time of the offence and originally protected by Section 39 of the Children and Young Persons Act 1933—pleaded guilty to conspiracy to steal a quad bike but denied manslaughter. Long, who was driving the SEAT, had previously admitted manslaughter and conspiracy to steal a quad bike. All three defendants denied murder.

On 13 March, the court heard that all parties agreed that the police constable first to attend to Harper on the A4 did not strike him with his vehicle, contrary to early reports of the incident.

The trial was temporarily suspended on 17 and 18 March as a member of the jury was unwell. The trial, which was being held during the COVID-19 pandemic, resumed on 19 March after two of the jurors were discharged because they were self-isolating. On 23 March, along with all other jury trials in England and Wales, the trial was suspended pending a review of operations amid the spread of COVID-19. During this subsequently abandoned trial, Thames Valley Police said they had received intelligence suggesting possible jury intimidation.

A retrial began on 23 June following changes to the UK's COVID-19 lockdown. On 20 July, a juror was discharged after a prison officer reported that she had mouthed "bye boys" to the defendants in the courtroom. The following day, the 11-person jury retired to deliberate. On 24 July, the three defendants were cleared of murder. Long had pleaded guilty to, and Bowers and Cole were found guilty of, manslaughter. Harper's widow had made a victim impact statement and later released an open letter, in which she implored Prime Minister Boris Johnson and Home Secretary Priti Patel to allow a retrial seeking a murder verdict.

On 31 July, Long was sentenced to 16 years and both Bowers and Cole to 13 years in prison. In his summary, on the matter as to whether the jury had been subject to any improper pressure, Edis said: "To the best of my knowledge and belief there is no truth in that at all". Harper's MP, John Howell, had said that he intended to ask for a review of the sentences.

Appeals 
On 4 August, the Attorney General's Office confirmed that it had received a request to review the sentences under the unduly lenient sentence scheme.

On 19 August 2020, Bowers and Cole made applications for permission to appeal against their convictions for manslaughter, and against the sentences that they had received.

On 21 August, the Attorney-General applied for permission to refer the killers' sentences to the Court of Appeal on the basis that she considered them to be "unduly lenient".

On 28 August, Long applied for permission to appeal against his sentence, on the basis that it was too severe.

The Attorney-General's application for permission to refer and the defendants' applications for permission to appeal were heard by the Court of Appeal on 30 November 2020, the Attorney-General Suella Braverman appearing personally.
On 16 December 2020 the Court of Appeal dismissed:
(1) the Attorney-General's application for permission to refer the sentences as unduly lenient;
(2) Long's application for permission to appeal against his sentence; and
(3) Bowers and Cole's applications for permission to appeal against their convictions.
Bowers and Cole's applications for permission to appeal against their sentences were granted, to enable the Court of Appeal to correct an error made in their sentencing for the offence of conspiracy to steal. Their sentences in respect of the manslaughter convictions were not altered. As their sentences for conspiracy to steal and for manslaughter were to run concurrently, their overall sentences were not affected.

Legacy 
Harper's funeral was held on 14 October 2019 at Christ Church Cathedral, Oxford. Members of the public lined the streets to watch the funeral procession, and over 800 people attended the service including Home Secretary Priti Patel and Oxford West and Abingdon MP Layla Moran—both of whom later paid respect to Harper in the House of Commons.

On 27 October 2019, 5,000 motorcyclists took part in a "ride of respect" between RAF Benson and Abingdon Airfield. On 28 January 2020, Harper was given a posthumous award by the Police Federation of England and Wales. In June 2020, Thames Valley Police have named the newest horse of their mounted section "Harper" as a tribute.

Harper's Law 
In August 2020, Harper's widow launched a campaign for a new law which would require life imprisonment for criminals whose actions result in the death of any police officer, prison officer, firefighter, nurse, doctor, or paramedic. Separately, Harper's mother launched a campaign to require killers of police officers to receive minimum jail terms of 20 years.

On November 24, 2021, the Ministry of Justice announced that they would introduce "Harper's Law", a bill extending mandatory life sentences to "anyone who commits the manslaughter of an emergency worker on duty – including police, prison officers, firefighters and paramedics – while carrying out another crime unless there are truly exceptional circumstances." The law was added to the statute book on 28 April 2022 and is now law. Both the Home Secretary Priti Patel and the Justice Secretary Dominic Raab credited Lissie Harper's campaign with convincing them to pass the law. Harper's Law did not affect the sentences of the three men already imprisoned for killing Andrew Harper.

See also 
 List of British police officers killed in the line of duty

Footnotes

References 

2019 deaths
2019 in England
2020s trials
August 2019 crimes in Europe
August 2019 events in the United Kingdom
British police officers killed in the line of duty
Crime in Berkshire
Deaths by person in England
Manslaughter in the United Kingdom
Murder trials
Sulhamstead
Trials in London